Heywood Hill is a bookshop at 10 Curzon Street in the Mayfair district of London.

History
The shop was opened by George Heywood Hill on 3 August 1936, with the help of Lady Anne Gathorne-Hardy, who would later become his wife. 

For the last three years of the Second World War, while George Heywood Hill was in the Army, Lady Anne ran the shop with the assistance of the novelist Nancy Mitford. John Saumarez Smith who had joined the staff straight from Cambridge in 1965, took up the reigns as manager in 1974, a position he held for over thirty years. In 1991, the shop was bought by Nancy Mitford's brother-in-law, Andrew Cavendish, 11th Duke of Devonshire.

From 2016 the shop has been owned by Peregrine Cavendish, 12th Duke of Devonshire. It has been managed by his son-in-law, Nicky Dunne since 2011. Heywood Hill specialises in rare books and collections of books, and has a service of assembling and delivering bespoke libraries for customers. It is has been described as the late Queen's favourite bookshop.

References

External links
 
 

1936 establishments in England
Antiquarian booksellers
Bookshops in London
Bookstores established in the 20th century
Buildings and structures in Mayfair
Grade II listed buildings in the City of Westminster
Independent bookshops of the United Kingdom
Retail companies established in 1936